Jeremy Crispian Stanley (born 26 March 1975) is a former New Zealand rugby union player. He was born in Otahuhu, New Zealand.

He played for the All Blacks, Ponsonby and Auckland and the  Hurricanes as a centre.

Personal life
Stanley attend Auckland Grammar School. He is married to former Silverferns captain Anna Stanley, and they reside in Auckland. After his rugby career Jeremy Stanley went to medical school and now specialises in paediatric and sport injury orthopaedic surgery. He is the cousin of Australian soccer player Tim Cahill, and the son of former All Black Joe Stanley.

References

External links

1975 births
Living people
New Zealand international rugby union players
People educated at Auckland Grammar School
Hurricanes (rugby union) players
New Zealand rugby union players
Rugby union centres
Jeremy
Rugby union players from Auckland